We Think as Instruments is the third studio album by instrumental musical duo I'm Not a Gun. It shows the duo heading towards more guitar-oriented post-rock music.

Track listing
"Soft Rain in the Spring" – 4:58
"Ripples in the Water" – 5:27
"Move" – 4:58
"Long Afternoon" – 5:43
"A Letter from the Past" – 4:09
"Rush Hour Traffic" – 2:47
"Unseen Moment" – 4:55
"Blue Garden" – 5:11
"As Far as Forever Goes" – 5:21
"Continuous Sky" – 5:16

Personnel 
John Tejada – drums, bass, guitar (4, 9, 10), electronics
Takeshi Nishimoto – guitar, bass, sarod

References 

2006 albums
I'm Not a Gun albums